Electric Island, Acoustic Sea is a collaborative studio album by Grammy Award-winning musicians Tak Matsumoto (Japanese guitarist of B'z fame) and Daniel Ho (American multi-instrumentalist). The album debuted at #7 on the Oricon weekly album chart and at #6 on the Billboard Japan album chart. "Island of Peace" and "Rain" are re-recordings of songs previously released in Matsumoto's 2014 solo album New Horizon.

Track listing

Personnel 
 Tak Matsumoto – electric guitar, arrangement on tracks 2, 6-11
 Daniel Ho – vocals on "Faithfully"; 12-string guitar on "Soaring on Dreams"; rhythm guitar on "Soaring on Dreams" and "Magokoro (True Heart)"; acoustic guitar on tracks 5, 8, 7, 9 and 12; bass on tracks 1, 4, 5 and 6; sanshin on "Fujiyama Highway"; Ukulele on "Fujiyama Highway" and "Sunny Tuesday"; tenor & soprano ukulele on "Island of Peace"; piano on tracks 1, 3, 4, 10 and 11; keyboard on tracks 1, 3 and 4; electric piano on "Omotesando"; triangle on "Infinite Escapade"; cymbal on "Infinite Escapade"; udu on "Sunny Tuesday" and "Rain"; uriuri on "Sunny Tuesday"; ipu heke on tracks 6, 10 and 11; shaker on "Sunny Tuesday" and "Rain"; Chinese cymbal on "Adrenaline UP!"; caxixi on "Island of Peace"; cha-cha on "Island of Peace" and "Rain"; talking drum, bongos, China cymbal and wood rattle on "Island of Peace"; arrangement on tracks 1, 3, 4, 5, 6, 8, 10-12

Session members 
 Steve Billman – bass on tracks 2-7 and 9, fretless bass on "Magokoro (True Heart)"
 Barry Sparks – bass on "Rain"
 David Enos – wood bass on "Island of Peace"
 Randy Drake – drums on tracks 1-4 and 6-9; taiko on tracks 2, 7, 8 and 11; agogô on "Fujiyama Highway"; güiro and tambourine on "Fujiyama Highway"
 Hiroko Ishikawa with Lime Ladies Orchestra – strings on "Island of Peace"
 Dana Xue – cello on "Magokoro (True Heart)" and "Adrenaline UP!"
 June Kuramoto – koto on tracks 2, 4, 8 and 11
 Hideyuki Terachi – arrangement on tracks 2, 7 and 9

References

External links
Electric Island, Acoustic Sea at B'z official website

2017 albums
Being Inc. albums
Instrumental albums
Tak Matsumoto albums
Collaborative albums